School Life is a 2019 French critically acclaimed award-winning teen comedy drama film written and directed by Grand Corps Malade and Mehdi Idir. The film stars Liam Pierron, Zita Hanrot and Moussa Monsaly in the lead roles. The film was released in France on 28 August 2019 and received positive reviews from critics becoming a box office success. The film was streamed via Netflix on 10 April 2020. It also received a number of awards and nominations at international film festivals.

Synopsis 
The new vice principal of a middle school in the suburb of Paris, Saint Denis, Samia (Zita Hanrot) is warned by her fellow teachers that students are unmotivated and do not abide by discipline. She sees things in a completely different manner compared to others. However, when she gets to know the students, especially Yanis (Liam Pierron) who is quite sharp and intelligent but disillusioned by a world that seems to have turned its back on him and his family, she tries her best to help him become more motivated to improve his grades and pursue a future in film.

Cast 

 Liam Pierron as Yanis Bensaadi
 Zita Hanrot as Samia Zibra
 Moussa Mansaly as Moussa
 Alban Ivanov as Dylan
 Soufiane Guerrab as Messaoud
 Antoine Reinartz as Thierry Bouchard
 Hocine Mokando as Farid Hammoudi

Awards and nominations

References

External links 
 
 

2019 films
2010s French-language films
2010s Arabic-language films
French comedy-drama films
French-language Netflix original films
2019 comedy-drama films
Films about education
Films about educators
Films about teacher–student relationships
Films set in schools
2019 multilingual films
French multilingual films
2010s French films